New Jersey City University (NJCU) is a public university in Jersey City, New Jersey. Originally chartered in 1927, and known as Jersey City State College for 40 years of its history, New Jersey City University consists of the School of Business, College of Arts and Sciences, College of Education, and College of Professional Studies. NJCU enrolls over 8,500 students and is part of New Jersey's public system of higher education.

History
 1927: The New Jersey State Normal School at Jersey City was chartered.
 1935: The name was changed to New Jersey State Teachers College at Jersey City. The institution was authorized to offer a four-year teacher education program and award the Bachelor of Science degree in education.
 1936: A degree program in health education and nursing was initiated in cooperation with the Jersey City Medical Center for the training of school nurses.
 1958: New Jersey State Teachers College at Jersey City became Jersey City State College and was authorized to award the bachelor of arts degree.
 1959: The institution began to offer the Master of Arts in elementary education.
 1968: Jersey City State College became a multipurpose institution, authorized to develop a liberal arts program and to enlarge teacher preparation programs.
 1985: The institution was awarded a $5.7 million Governor's Challenge Grant for an expanded Cooperative Education Program, which would serve all academic majors.
 1998: The New Jersey Commission on Higher Education approved a petition submitted by the JCSC Board of Trustees requesting that the institution be granted university status and renamed New Jersey City University. The university was restructured into three colleges of Arts and Sciences, Education, and Professional Studies.
 2003: NJCU joined with the City of Jersey City, the Jersey City Board of Education, and New Jersey Transit to collaborate on the Jersey City Bayfront Plan. The West Campus Redevelopment Plan is a part of this project and NJCU is a major player in the university-Community Partnership.
 2012: After 19 years, NJCU President Carlos Hernandez retired. Under his tenure, three new buildings were erected and, in 1998, the school became a university.
 2013: On September 20, NJCU inaugurated Dr. Sue Henderson to be the 12th president of New Jersey City University. She is the first woman to hold the position.
 2022: In June 2022, NJCU declared financial emergency and the sought a $10 million lifeline from the state government. Henderson resigned as president of the university, effective July 1. In August, Governor Phil Murphy called for an investigation into NJCU's dramatic change in financial standing from a surplus of $108 million in 2013 to a deficit of $67 million amid plans to expand NJCU's campus.

Academics

NJCU is organized into four colleges offering 41 undergraduate study and 27 graduate degree programs.

The largest programs of study at NJCU are psychology, nursing, early childhood education, and music. In addition, the NJCU Fire Science program is the only university-based bachelor's degree fire science program in the State of New Jersey. NJCU has a department of professional security studies that prepares students for work with agencies such as the FBI, NSA, and CIA.

The NJCU Media Arts Department is the home base and sponsor of the annual Black Maria Film and Video Festival, an international juried competition and traveling exhibition which recognizes and supports independent film, video and emerging media.

A. Harry Moore School
A special needs school operated by NJCU and the Jersey City Board of Education, the A. Harry Moore Laboratory School was first opened in 1931 and offers academic, therapeutic, and social programs for approximately 140 students between the ages of three and 21. The students are classified as Preschool Disabled, Learning and Language Disabled, and/or Multiply Disabled. The school has operated under the direction of the College of Education of NJCU since 1963.

In September 2019, it was announced that the school would close in 2020, though the decision was quickly walked back after public and political backlash.

In 2021, a former principal sued both the school and University alleging wrongful termination after he pushed for stricter COVID-19 protocols.

Campus

Main campus

The university's main campus is situated on a landscaped campus in an urban community located at 2039 Kennedy Boulevard Jersey City. The university's administrative center is Hepburn Hall. Designed by Guilbert and Betelle and completed in 1930, the Gothic structure serves as the symbol of the university and features in school publications as well as the university's athletic nickname.

The NJCU Frank J. Guarini Library is available to students as well as staff for learning materials such as books, DVDs, CDs, computer lab, quiet study rooms and access to electronic databases. Since the Fall 2014 semester, despite some objections by librarians, there has been a Dunkin Donuts franchise operating out of the first floor of the library.

A six-story Arts and Sciences building named Karnoutsos Hall was designed by architect Michael Graves. It is known by students as the Crayola building, because of the colors which make up the building's exterior, and as the K building. It is located in the center of the campus. The  building, houses 14 classrooms, 10 computer labs, faculty offices for nine departments, and the Office of the Dean of Arts and Sciences.

Other academic buildings include Rossey Hall, (music, dance, and theatre; sociology and anthropology; environmental and earth science; nursing; and educational counseling; as well as numerous classrooms), the Science Building (natural sciences), the Professional Studies Building (education departments; national security/security studies; criminal justice); Fries Hall (media arts); and Grossnickle Hall. The Visual Arts Building on Culver Avenue features a Maya Lin sculpture in the entrance garden area.

West campus - University Place
There are renovated buildings on West Side Avenue that are part of the school, including the West Side Theatre, which is used for theatrical productions and community events. Another building houses the Business Development Incubator program.
NJCU is in the midst of a major expansion, which will include a new 21-acre west campus, situated between West Side Avenue and New Jersey Route 440. The first building, a student residence, opened in 2016. The new campus will include a performing arts center, student housing, a college of education, and a business school.
Construction has begun on the new "West Campus" between West Side Avenue and Bayfront on Route 440 that will more than double the campus's total area. The West Campus will include academic buildings, residences, retail spaces, parking, and a University Promenade. The center of will be the Center for Music Theater Dance.
 and the Joffrey Ballet School.

Athletic complex
The university's Thomas M. Gerrity Athletic Complex is located less than a mile southwest of the main campus at near Droyers Point on Newark Bay. In 2017, the New York Red Bulls of Major League Soccer entered into a facility usage partnership with the university to upgrade the natural grass soccer training field at the complex to professionally approved standards. Under the partnership, national and international teams will be allowed to train at the facility ahead of their matches at Red Bull Arena. Phase one of the project began in early June 2017 and involved regrading, aeration and reseeding of the training facility. The project, which is still ongoing, will also involve overall maintenance of the training facility.

NJCU School of Business
In September 2015, the NJCU School of Business opened at Harborside Plaza directly on the Jersey City waterfront. The two-story facility features 18 instructional spaces, two data science centers, a simulated trading floor, an auditorium, offices, study areas, a student lounge, and a large waterfront conference center with views of Lower Manhattan.

Campus living
The university operates four residence halls: Co-op Hall, a corridor-style facility with common area bathrooms and study lounges for freshmen and first year dorm students; Vodra Hall, a traditional dormitory with shared bathrooms between rooms for upper-class students and special needs individuals; and 2040 University Apartments, a residence for seniors and others of age 21 and up. The fourth is a new residence hall on the west campus.

Athletics
NJCU is a member of Division III of the National Collegiate Athletic Association (NCAA).

 The John J. Moore Athletics and Fitness Center (JMAC) is the home of the Gothic Knight basketball, volleyball and wrestling programs and the focal point for the NJCU athletic department and recreation and intramural activities. The  JMAC opened in the fall of 1998, giving the university one of the finest indoor recreational facilities in the area. The building features a 2,000-seat basketball and volleyball arena, an exercise and fitness center, a 25-yard swimming and diving pool with adjacent sauna, a tenth-of-a-mile elevated jogging track, a multi-purpose room for aerobics and classes, and locker room space for teams, students, faculty and staff.
 New Jersey City University sponsors 22 intercollegiate athletic programs in baseball, men's and women's basketball, women's bowling, men's and women's cross country, eSports, men's and women's golf, men's and women's soccer, softball, men's and women's tennis, men's and women's indoor and outdoor track and field, men's and women's wrestling, and men's and women's volleyball.
 The women's bowling team has qualified for the first seven NCAA National Collegiate Championship events from 2004 to 2010. The Gothic Knights have advanced to the national semifinals four times, always coming in even-numbered years: 2004, 2006, 2008 and 2010, finishing third nationally in 2004 and 2008. NJCU hosted the 2010 NCAA Championship in New Brunswick, N.J.
 The men's basketball team is the oldest program, having reached the Final Four in 1986 and 1992. The team has appeared in 21 NCAA Tournaments, most recently in three consecutive years from 2017 to 2019.
 The baseball team now, under tenth-year head coach Jerry Smith, along with long-time assistant coaches Nick Cesare and Raj Subramanian have built the program into a contender which has culminated in a win over the No. 1 ranked team in the nation and program records for wins in a single season and two, three and four-year periods.
 In the 2020-2021 year, the university began offering varsity programs in eSports, men's and women's tennis, and men's and women's wrestling. It's the first university in New Jersey or the tristate area to ever offer a collegiate program for women's wrestling, the first new men's wrestling in the state since 1997, and one of the first to offer eSports at the varsity level.

Greek life
Greek organizations offered at New Jersey City University include:
Alpha Phi Omega fraternity
Iota Phi Theta fraternity
Kappa Alpha Psi fraternity
Lambda Sigma Upsilon fraternity
Lambda Tau Omega sorority
Lambda Theta Alpha sorority
Lambda Theta Phi fraternity
Mu Sigma Upsilon sorority
Omega Phi Chi sorority
Phi Chi Epsilon sorority
Phi Mu Alpha fraternity
Psi Sigma Phi fraternity
Sigma Alpha Iota fraternity (female)
Sigma Lambda Beta fraternity
Tau Kappa Epsilon fraternity
Zeta Phi Beta sorority
Phi Beta Sigma fraternity
Alpha Kappa Alpha sorority
Lambda Pi Upsilon sorority
Alpha Phi Alpha fraternity

Student newspaper
The Gothic Times is New Jersey City University's official student newspaper. It was reintroduced in 2001 and prints monthly issues, excluding June, July and August. It features stories about campus happenings as well as articles on lifestyle, sports, arts and entertainment. It also features an editorial and opinion/advice section.

See also
:Category:New Jersey City University faculty
:Category:New Jersey City University alumni
Bayfront, Jersey City
Hudson County Community College

References

External links

Map: 
Official website
Official athletics website

 
Educational institutions established in 1927
New Jersey City University
Universities and colleges in Hudson County, New Jersey
1927 establishments in New Jersey
Buildings and structures in Jersey City, New Jersey
Public universities and colleges in New Jersey